In mathematics, −1 is the additive inverse of 1.

−1, minus one, or negative one may also refer to:

Science

Mathematics 
 the exponent −1 denoting a multiplicative inverse
 the superscript −1 denoting an inverse function

Arts

Literature 
 "Minus One", a 1963 short story by J. G. Ballard

Bands 
 Minus One (band), a band from Cyprus

Songs 
 "The Negative One", a song by Slipknot from .5: The Gray Chapter
 "−1", a song by Mudvayne from L.D. 50

See also 
 1 (disambiguation)
 −2 (disambiguation)